The ninth season of Big Brother Germany began on 8 December 2008 and ended on 6 July 2009 for a total of 211 days. The 9th This season was hosted by Miriam Pielhau and Alida-Nadine Lauenstein. The theme for this season's house was Heaven and Hell. Andy, Beni, Cathy, Daniel, Geraldine, and Madeleine entered on launch night with 24 other housemates entering throughout the season.

Big Brother Reloaded 
From Day 36 (12 January 2009) onwards, the concept of this season was changed due to bad ratings. There was one main living area, "Heaven", where all housemates lived. "Hell" was only used as living area for punished or nominated housemates. Because of the structural changes of the interior, alteration that were done on Day 34 and 35 forced the housemates to live in the 2 rooms used for matches. On Day 43, 3 former housemates re-entered the house, Sascha Sirtl (season 5 winner), Andreas "Knubbel" Büttgenbach (5th place in season 7), and Marcel Schiefelbein (season 8 runner-up). They were eligible to win the 250,000 € prize.

Housemates

Nominations table

 Housemates current living on the hell side of the house.
 Housemates current living on the heaven side of the house.

Notes

Only the housemates on the hell side of the house could be nominated. As new housemates, Eisi and Jana were immune from getting nominated. The audience saved Beni from being up for eviction.
There were two separate evictions on day 29, one for the housemates who entered in the first eight days, which was decided by a housemate vote. Delia had the most votes but was saved by the audience, resulting in Eisi's eviction (because he had the second-highest number of votes). The other eviction was for Desi and Oliver, who entered the house on Christmas Eve, which should have been decided by the heavenly housemates, but the initial vote resulted in a tie. Therefore, the public had to evict one of them. 
Eisi, who was evicted in the last eviction, had to choose one person to nominate two people for eviction as "revenge" for his eviction. He chose Daniel.
Delia, who was evicted on Day 36, had to choose three housemates to be automatically up for eviction. She chose Daniel, Cathy, and Sascha. 
The seven housemates not nominated for eviction in round four had to choose one housemate who they wanted to be evicted. Beni and Oliver both received two votes so the public had to decide between the two of them who they wanted to evict.
All housemates have to nominate as normal. The three or more housemates with the most votes are up for eviction. The public could choose one housemate to be immune to eviction. They chose Sascha S. Sascha S. had to choose one of the housemates, who received one nomination vote, to replace him. He chose Annina. Andy came up for eviction due to persistent rule-breaking.
All housemates have to nominate as normal. Beni, Daniel, Knubbel, Sascha, and Sascha S. were drilled by a drill instructor. The drill instructor decides who gets nominated because of weak performance. He chose Sascha.
Housemates were asked which housemates should live in Hell for the following week. What they did not know was that all housemates living in Hell would be immune from eviction. Beni, Daniel, Jana, and Madeleine volunteered and therefore were immune from eviction. There was a surprise double eviction.
Housemates nominated one person. Geraldine was given immunity from eviction by a public vote.
This time housemates nominate to save. The four housemates with the fewest votes are up for eviction. As Bettie is a new housemate, she was immune from eviction.
Housemates will nominate face to face. The four housemates with the most votes are up for eviction. As Claudine, Claudy, and Patricia are new housemates, they are immune from eviction. As they were only three housemates nominated, the public could nominate one housemate directly. They chose Geraldine. Before this vote, Sascha S. was saved from the public. Bettie left the house shortly after the nominations, housemates had to vote who should be the fourth housemate nominated. The second round of nominations is displayed in the bottom row. As Annina, Marcel, and Orhan received three votes each, Sascha S. had to decide which housemates should be up for eviction. He chose Annina.
Housemates have to nominate two people for eviction. Sascha S. received immunity as he won a karaoke competition last week. As Claudine and Sascha received 2 nominations each, the public has to decide who of the both should be up for eviction. They chose Claudine.
Only the most popular female, Geraldine, and male housemate, Sascha S., are eligible to nominate this week. They have to nominate a housemate of the same gender. Furthermore, these two are immune from eviction. As there have to be four housemates up for eviction, the remaining six housemates will be split into pairs for an assault course. The slowest pair will also be up for eviction.
As there are more male than female housemates in the house, only the male housemates could be nominated this week.
As decided by Big Brother, all-female housemates apart from Anna and Nadine were nominated.
Housemates nominated as normal. As there were only two housemates up for eviction, the public chose Orhan and Sascha to also be up for eviction. The three non-evicted housemates remained nominated.
Alongside Nadine, Orhan, and Sascha, Anna chose Diana to be her replacement on the nomination list.
Housemates nominated as normal. Geraldine was saved by a public vote.
The male housemates competed against the female housemate in a Fun Fair task. The losing team is automatically nominated.
Every housemate chooses one person who they want to be evicted. The housemate with the most votes is evicted.

External links
Official Homepage
Housemate pictures, Nominations and Evictions 

2008 German television seasons
2009 German television seasons
09